Caldes de Malavella is a municipality of the comarca of Selva in Catalonia, Spain. In 2014, its population was 7,130.

The place was formerly very famous for its thermal baths.

Transport
Public transport is generally accessible within Caldes de Malavella. It is also well- connected to other cities in Spain through the rail system.

Rail
Caldes de Malavella is served at the Caldes de Malavella railway station to the West of the urban centre. It is connected via the Barcelona Sants to Portbou railway line run by the Renfe railway network. The journey time to Girona and Barcelona is approximately 20 minutes and 1 hour and 30 minutes respectively. The frequency of the train ranges from 10 minutes to an hour.

Bus
It is also possible to travel from Girona to Caldes de Malavella via bus. The journey time from Girona is approximately an hour.

Airport
The nearest airport to Caldes de Malavella is Girona-Costa Brava Airport. There is no direct bus from the airport to Caldes de Malavella. One may either drive (taxi or car rental) directly from the airport by taking the NII / A2 direction towards Barcelona or first take a bus to Girona city centre before taking another bus or train from the city centre to Caldes de Malavella.

Notable people 
 Iván Balliu, footballer

References

External links

Official web site of the municipality of Caldes de Malavella
 Government data pages 

Municipalities in Selva
Populated places in Selva
Spa towns in Catalonia